The Bride Was Beautiful is a 1986 Hungarian-Italian drama film directed by Pál Gábor.

Cast

 Ángela Molina: Maria
 Massimo Ghini: Sergio
 Stefania Sandrelli: Carmela
 Simona Cavallari: Giovanna
 Marco Leonardi: Giuseppe 
 Guia Jelo: mother of Giovanna

External links
 

1986 films
Hungarian drama films
Films directed by Pál Gábor
Italian drama films
Films scored by Nicola Piovani
1980s Italian films